Hollingworth Lake Rowing Club is a rowing club on Hollingworth Lake and based at The Clubhouse, Lake Bank, Littleborough, Greater Manchester. The club was founded in 1872 but the current clubhouse was built in 1972.

The club has produced multiple British champions.

Honours

British champions

References

Sport in Greater Manchester
Rowing clubs in England